Mingle Media TV Network is a digital TV network offering scripted, unscripted, live and produced lifestyle, celebrity and entertainment programming seven days a week. Founded on 8 February 2010, the network is a leading producer of independent filmmaker content in the web TV series. Mingle Media TV Network publishes their content through its web syndication network, including iTunes, Blip.TV, YouTube, Facebook, Twitter, Blogs, DailyMotion, Roku, Boxee and via the Stickam.com mobile app.

Mingle Media TV Network executive produces live streaming, interactive web TV lifestyle talk shows, host and distribute Red Carpet Report highlighting Film Festivals and Filmmakers, and independent filmmakers and web series creators. Mingle Media TV Network also is the sponsor of the Audience Choice Awards category for the New Media Film Festival.

Mingle Media TV Network on Television 
Mingle Media TV provides content to Roku, Boxee, DivX TV, Vizio, Samsung via set-top boxes and web-enabled televisions.

Awards 
Honorable Mention by Indie Intertube TV for Support of Independent TV Creators and Community 2010 Indie Intertube Awards

References 

 
 
 
 *
 
 
  Article from LIFE AT THE INTERSECTION OF TELEVISION AND DIGITAL

External links 
 

Internet television channels